Ticket to Paradise (Swedish: Biljett till paradiset) is a 1962 Swedish drama film directed by Arne Mattsson and starring Christina Schollin, Lars Ekborg and Eva Dahlbeck. It was shot at the Sundbyberg Studios in Stockholm and on location in Tuscany. The film's sets were designed by the art director Arne Åkermark.

Cast
 Christina Schollin as Pyret Sträng
 Lars Ekborg as Niklas Blom
 Eva Dahlbeck as 	Rita Carol
 Per Oscarsson as 	Freddo Rossi
 Stig Järrel as 	Director Lund
 Sif Ruud as Mrs. Berg
 Sigge Fürst as 	Torsson
 Ragnar Ulfung as 	Luigi
 Hjördis Petterson as 	Mother Rossi
 Yngve Gamlin as 	Italian Violinist
 Nils Hallberg as 	Falén
 Eddie Axberg as 	Piccolon
 Christina Carlwind as Karin
 Mona Geijer-Falkner as 	Kund i saluhallen
 Sven Magnusson as 	Interpreter
 Elisabeth Odén as 	Bibi
 Georg Skarstedt as 	Kund i saluhallen
 Berndt Westerberg as 	Receptionschefen
 Birger Åsander as 	Kund i saluhallen

References

Bibliography 
 Qvist, Per Olov & von Bagh, Peter. Guide to the Cinema of Sweden and Finland. Greenwood Publishing Group, 2000.

External links 
 

1962 films
Swedish drama films
1962 drama films
1960s Swedish-language films
Films directed by Arne Mattsson
Films shot in Italy
Films set in Italy
1960s Swedish films